Nicole Kristal is a script coordinator and founder of the #StillBisexual campaign. She is the coauthor with Mike Szymanski of The Bisexual's Guide to the Universe, which received the Lambda Literary Award for Bisexual Literature in 2006.

References 

Year of birth missing (living people)
Living people
Lambda Literary Award winners
Bisexual women
University of Oregon alumni
American bisexual writers